Campanus can refer to:

 Giovanni Antonio Campani called Campanus (1427–1477), Italian humanist
 Campanus of Novara (1220–1296), Italian astrologer, astronomer, and mathematician; also:
 Campanus (crater), a lunar crater named for him
 the astrological house system named after him; see House (astrology)#Campanus
 Johannes Vodnianus Campanus (1572–1622), Czech humanist, composer, pedagogue, poet, and dramatist
 Johann Campanus (fl. 1530) Belgian Anabaptist religious reformer
 Campania, a region of Italy

See also
John Campanius (1601–1683), Swedish Lutheran clergyman

Latin-language surnames